is a Japanese molecular biologist known for research on cell cycle and chromosome structure using the fission yeast Schizosaccharomyces pombe. He was elected as a foreign member of the Royal Society on 11 May 2000.

Education and early life
Yanagida was born in Tokyo, and received his doctorate in science from the University of Tokyo in 1970.

Career and research
He was Professor of Biophysics at Kyoto University from 1977 to 2004, where he served as Dean of Graduate School of Biostudies from 2001 to 2003. After retiring from Kyoto University and becoming Professor Emeritus, he has been Professor of the G0 Cell Unit at the Okinawa Institute of Science and Technology.

Awards and honors

Yanagida is an Honorary Fellow of the Society of Biology since 2010 and foreign associate of the National Academy of Sciences, USA since 2012.

He received many awards including the Order of Culture (2011) and the Imperial Prize of the Japan Academy (2003).

References

Japanese molecular biologists
Japanese biophysicists
Japanese physiologists
Cell biologists
Academic staff of Kyoto University
University of Tokyo alumni
1941 births
Living people
People from Tokyo
Laureates of the Imperial Prize
Recipients of the Order of Culture
Foreign Members of the Royal Society
Foreign associates of the National Academy of Sciences